Jonas Svensson was the defending champion, but lost in the second round to Jacco Eltingh.

Magnus Larsson won the title by defeating Anders Järryd 6–4, 7–6(7–5) in the final.

Seeds

Draw

Finals

Top half

Bottom half

References

External links
 Official results archive (ATP)
 Official results archive (ITF)

Copenhagen Open
Singles